Tyler Sonsie (born 27 January 2003) is a professional Australian rules footballer playing for the Richmond Football Club in the Australian Football League (AFL). Sonsie was drafted by Richmond with the 28th pick in the 2021 AFL Draft, and made his AFL debut in round 18 of the 2022 season.

AFL career

2022 season
He made his debut in Round 18 of the 2022 season and held his spot for the remainder of the season, as well as in the club's elimination final loss to Brisbane.

AFL statistics
Updated to the end of the 2022 season.

|-
| 2022
|  || 40 || 7 || 3 || 3 || 71 || 52 || 123 || 18 || 13 || 0.4 || 0.4 || 10.1 || 7.4 || 17.6 || 2.6 || 1.9
|- class="sortbottom" 
! colspan=3| Career
! 7
! 3
! 3
! 71
! 52
! 123
! 18
! 13
! 0.4
! 0.4
! 10.1
! 7.4
! 17.6
! 2.6
! 1.9
|}

References

External links

2003 births
Living people
Australian players of Australian rules football
Richmond Football Club players